Detour de Force is the thirteenth studio album by Canadian rock band Barenaked Ladies, released on 16 July 2021 by Raisin' Records. It was released in CD, digital and double transparent-blue vinyl formats.

The album was recorded in two spans; first at Ed Robertson's cottage in February–March 2020, followed by sessions at Noble Street Studios and Vespa Studios in Toronto, Ontario in June–August 2020. Production was interrupted by the COVID-19 pandemic which delayed the band's touring and album release schedule as well.

Production
The original cottage sessions were produced by Mark Howard. The band had intended a more stripped-down session which would have been followed by limited studio time to add finishing touches, but the cottage sessions were interrupted in mid-March 2020 by the COVID-19 pandemic. As a result, the band had more time to complete the record, and spent June–August 2020 with producer Eric Ratz reshaping the record.

Singles
The lead single, "Flip", was made available for download on 12 April 2021. This was followed by "New Disaster" which premiered on 4 June 2021. The third single, "Good Life," was released simultaneously with the album on 16 July 2021. Each song was accompanied by a music video.

Track listing

Personnel
Barenaked Ladies
Jim Creeggan – electric and double bass, cello, electric guitar, Taurus pedals, vocals, string & horn arrangements on "Paul Chambers"
Kevin Hearn – pianos, keyboards, Continuum, accordion, acoustic and electric guitars, drum loops, vocals
Ed Robertson – vocals, acoustic and electric guitars, percussion, drums on "Internal Dynamo"
Tyler Stewart – drums, percussion, vocals

References

2021 albums
Barenaked Ladies albums
Albums recorded at Noble Street Studios